Coolbaugh Township is a township in Monroe County, Pennsylvania, United States. The population was 20,805 at the 2020 census.  Tobyhanna State Park is in Coolbaugh Township.  Tobyhanna, an unincorporated community, is also located in Coolbaugh Township rather than  Tobyhanna Township.

Geography

Demographics

2010 Census Data
At the 2010 census there were 20,564 people, 6,969 households, and 5,362 families living in the township. The population density was 238.6 people per square mile (92.1/km2). There were 11,163 housing units at an average density of 129.5/sq mi (50.6/km2). The racial makeup of the township was 56.4% White, 27.8% African American, 0.7% Native American, 1.8% Asian, 0.1% Pacific Islander, 8.6% from other races, and 4.6% from two or more races. Hispanic or Latino of any race were 23.3%.

There were 6,969 households, 37.6% had children under the age of 18 living with them, 54.3% were married couples living together, 16.6% had a female householder with no husband present, and 23.1% were non-families. 18.5% of households were made up of individuals, and 6.1% were one person aged 65 or older. The average household size was 2.95 and the average family size was 3.35.

The age distribution was 28.5% under the age of 18, 61.3% from 18 to 64, and 10.2% 65 or older. The median age was 37.4 years.

The median household income was $54,339 and the median family income  was $59,139. Males had a median income of $42,813 versus $32,256 for females. The per capita income for the township was $19,816. About 15.1% of families and 17.2% of the population were below the poverty line, including 26.1% of those under age 18 and 4.8% of those age 65 or over.

2000 Census Data
At the 2000 census there were 15,205 people, 5,101 households, and 4,050 families living in the township. The population density was 177.3 people per square mile (68.5/km2). There were 9,376 housing units at an average density of 109.4/sq mi (42.2/km2).  The racial makeup of the township was 71.58% White, 15.68% African American, 0.28% Native American, 1.01% Asian, 0.07% Pacific Islander, 7.34% from other races, and 4.04% from two or more races. Hispanic or Latino of any race were 15.30%.

There were 5,101 households, 42.2% had children under the age of 18 living with them, 63.1% were married couples living together, 11.1% had a female householder with no husband present, and 20.6% were non-families. 16.3% of households were made up of individuals, and 5.8% were one person aged 65 or older. The average household size was 2.98 and the average family size was 3.34.

The age distribution was 31.6% under the age of 18, 7.0% from 18 to 24, 28.4% from 25 to 44, 22.4% from 45 to 64, and 10.5% 65 or older. The median age was 36 years. For every 100 females, there were 97.7 males. For every 100 females age 18 and over, there were 93.5 males.

The median household income was $46,684 and the median family income  was $50,499. Males had a median income of $40,155 versus $22,592 for females. The per capita income for the township was $17,094. About 8.4% of families and 11.8% of the population were below the poverty line, including 15.0% of those under age 18 and 14.2% of those age 65 or over.

Climate

According to the Trewartha climate classification system, Coolbaugh Township has a Temperate Continental climate (Dc) with warm summers (b), cold winters (o) and year-around precipitation (Dcbo). Dcbo climates are characterized by at least one month having an average mean temperature ≤ , four to seven months with an average mean temperature ≥ , all months with an average mean temperature <  and no significant precipitation difference between seasons. Although most summer days are comfortably humid in Coolbaugh Township, episodes of heat and high humidity can occur with heat index values > . July is the peak month for thunderstorm activity, which correlates with the average warmest month of the year. The average wettest month is September, which correlates with tropical storm remnants during the peak month of the Atlantic hurricane season. Since 1981, the wettest calendar day was 6.74 inches (171 mm) on September 30, 2010. Since 1981, the coldest air temperature has been  on January 22, 1984. Episodes of extreme cold and wind can occur with wind chill values < . The average snowiest month is January, which correlates with the average coldest month of the year. Ice storms and large snowstorms depositing ≥ 12 inches (30 cm) of snow occur nearly every year, particularly during nor’easters from December through March.

Transportation

Interstate 380 is the most prominent highway serving Coolbaugh Township. It follows a southeast-northwest alignment through the center of the township, with interchanges for Pennsylvania Route 423/Pennsylvania Route 611 and Pennsylvania Route 435/Pennsylvania Route 507. PA 423 follows Propect Street and Church Street along a southwest-northeast alignment through the middle of the township. PA 435 begins at I-380 in the northwest corner of the township and heads northwestward. PA 507 begins at PA 435 in the northwest corner of the township and heads northeastward. PA 611 starts at I-380 in the middle of the township and heads southeastward into the southeastern portion of the township to the northeast of I-380. Other state highways serving the township include Pennsylvania Route 191, which briefly passes through the northeast corner of the township, and Pennsylvania Route 196, which follows a north-south alignment across the eastern part of the township.

Pocono Mountains Municipal Airport is located between I-380 and PA 611 in the southeastern corner of the township.

Ecology

According to the A. W. Kuchler U.S. potential natural vegetation types, Coolbaugh Township would have a dominant vegetation type of Northern Hardwood (106) with a dominant vegetation form of Northern hardwood forest (26). The peak spring bloom typically occurs in early-May and peak fall color usually occurs in early-October.

References

External links
Coolbaugh Township

Townships in Monroe County, Pennsylvania
Townships in Pennsylvania